Iago is the main antagonist in the play Othello by William Shakespeare

Iago may also refer to:

Biology
 Iago (fish), a genus of hound sharks
 Iago sparrow, endemic to the Cape Verde archipelago

Characters
 Iago (Aladdin), a parrot in the 1992 film Aladdin and various Disney media
 Iago, a character in the American television series Gargoyles

People
 Iago, a form of the given name Jacob or James
 Iago (footballer, born 1995) or Iago Sampaio Silva, Brazilian footballer
 Iago (footballer, born 1997) or Iago Amaral Borduchi, Brazilian footballer
 Iago (footballer, born 1999) or Iago Fabrício Gonçalves dos Reis, a Brazilian footballer
 Iago ap Beli (c. 560–c. 616), king of Gwynedd
 Iago ap Idwal (ruled 950–979), king of Gwynedd
 Iago Falque (born 1990), is a Spanish footballer who plays as an attacking midfielder
 Iago Iglesias (born 1984), known simply as Iago, a Spanish professional footballer
 Iago, a pen-name of Sir Robert Walpole

Place
 Iago, Texas, United States
 Santiago, Cape Verde, an island also called "St. Iago" or "St. Jago"

Other
 Iago (film),  a 2009 Italian film
 IAGO, the International Abstract Games Organization
 Iago, a GWR Banking Class steam locomotive on the Great Western Railway
 Porth Iago, the site of the ancient St Medin's Church near Aberdaron, Gwynedd, Wales
 A Spanish variant of the name Jacob

See also
 
 Jago (disambiguation)
 Yago (disambiguation)